American rock band Thirty Seconds to Mars has released five studio albums, three extended plays, sixteen singles, four promotional singles, one video album and sixteen music videos. The band was formed in Los Angeles, California, in 1998 by brothers Jared Leto and Shannon Leto, with Tomo Miličević joining the band later. The band's debut album, 30 Seconds to Mars, was released through Immortal and Virgin Records in August 2002 and peaked at number 107 on the US Billboard 200 and number one on the US Top Heatseekers, selling more than two million copies worldwide as of March 2011. The album produced two singles, "Capricorn (A Brand New Name)" and "Edge of the Earth".

The band released their second album, A Beautiful Lie, in August 2005. It peaked at number 38 on the US Billboard 200 and received multiple certifications all over the world, including platinum in the United States. The first single from the album, "Attack", was the most added track on American alternative radio during its first week of release, while "The Kill", the second single, set a record for the longest-running hit in the history of the US Alternative Songs chart when it remained on the national chart for more than 50 weeks, following its number three peak in 2006. The third single, "From Yesterday", topped the US Alternative Songs for several weeks. "A Beautiful Lie" was released as the album's fourth single in some territories.

In 2008, the band attempted to sign with a new label, prompting EMI to file a $30 million lawsuit, claiming that Thirty Seconds to Mars was obligated to produce three more albums as required by its contract. The case settled as the band returned to EMI, and This Is War, the third album, arrived in December 2009. The album peaked at number 18 in the United States and reached the top ten of several national album charts, including Austria, New Zealand and Portugal. Its first two singles, "Kings and Queens" and "This Is War", reached the number-one spot on the US Alternative Songs chart. The third single, "Closer to the Edge", topped the UK Rock Chart for eight consecutive weeks. The band collaborated with rapper Kanye West on the single "Hurricane 2.0", which was released as the album's fourth single in selected territories and reached number four on the UK Rock Chart. Their fourth studio album, Love, Lust, Faith and Dreams, was released through Universal in May 2013 and reached the top ten in more than fifteen countries, including the United Kingdom and the United States. Its singles "Up in the Air", "Do or Die", and "City of Angels" reached the top twenty in Portugal and on the US Alternative Songs chart. The band released their fifth studio album, America, in April 2018, preceded by the single "Walk on Water".

Studio albums

Extended plays

Singles

Promotional singles

Other charted songs

Other appearances

Video albums

Music videos

Notes

 A  Worldwide sales figures for 30 Seconds to Mars as of March 2011.
 B  United States sales figures for 30 Seconds to Mars as of August 2006.
 C  Worldwide sales figures for A Beautiful Lie as of February 2012.
 D  United States sales figures for A Beautiful Lie as of December 2009.
 E  United Kingdom sales figures for A Beautiful Lie as of February 2012.
 F  Worldwide sales figures for This Is War as of May 2013.
 G  United States sales figures for This Is War as of March 2013.
 H  United Kingdom sales figures for This Is War as of April 2018.
 I  United States sales figures for Love, Lust, Faith and Dreams as of July 2016.
 J  "Up in the Air" did not enter the Billboard Hot 100, but peaked at number 7 on the Bubbling Under Hot 100 Singles chart.
 K  "Walk on Water" did not enter the Billboard Hot 100, but peaked at number 6 on the Bubbling Under Hot 100 Singles chart.
 L  "Dangerous Night" did not enter the NZ Top 40 Singles Chart, but peaked at number 10 on the NZ Heatseeker Singles Chart.
 M  "Stay" did not enter the Rock Songs chart, but peaked at number 41 on the Rock Digital Songs chart.

References

External links

Discography
Discographies of American artists
Rock music group discographies